James Julian Rogers (born 20 August 1958) is an English solicitor and former first-class cricketer.

Born at Kendal, Rogers was educated at Sedbergh School, before going up to University College, Oxford to study modern history. While studying at Oxford he played first-class cricket for Oxford University, making his debut against Glamorgan at Oxford in 1979. He played first-class cricket for Oxford from 1979–1981, making a total of 26 appearances at first-class level. Rogers ended his first-class career having scored a total of 693 runs at an average of 16.50, with a highest score of 54. He also bowled eight overs with his slow bowling across his career, taking a single wicket and conceding 39 runs. In the same year he made his debut for Oxford, Rogers also made a single appearance in minor counties cricket for Cumberland against Durham at Millom in the Minor Counties Championship. After graduating from University College he became a solicitor.

References

External links

1958 births
Living people
Sportspeople from Kendal
Cricketers from Cumbria
People educated at Sedbergh School
Alumni of University College, Oxford
English cricketers
Oxford University cricketers
Cumberland cricketers
English solicitors